Giulia Diletta Leotta (born 16 August 1991) is an Italian television presenter from Catania, Sicily. Leotta currently presents the Serie A broadcasts for DAZN since the 2018–2019 season. Earlier, she had presented Serie B games on Sky Sport with Gianluca Di Marzio and Luca Marchegiani. From April to August of 2018, Leotta worked alongside Aída Yéspica as the host of 105 Take Away, a program of Radio 105 Network. Leotta hosted with Francesco Facchinetti the 2018 edition of Miss Italia that was aired by La7 and won by Carlotta Maggiorana. In 2020, Leotta co-presented the 70th annual edition of the
Sanremo Music Festival.

Leotta studied law at the Luiss University in Rome and graduated in 2015.

References

Living people
1991 births
Italian television presenters
Mass media people from Catania